The Euro XIII is an upcoming European men's rugby league competition.

History 
The Euro XIII was announced in May 2020. On May 28 it was announced that the 2021 cup competition would feature 16 teams, instead of the 8 originally planned. Tiziano Franchini is tasked with the governance of the league. On October 2nd 2020 it was announced the 2021 tournament would be pushed back to February 2022 due to the COVID-19 pandemic in Europe. It was also announced the competition format would be changed to include a Group stage.

Clubs 
Any domestic club throughout Europe is eligible to enter an application to join the league.

2022 Clubs
All 16 clubs have been announced.

Draft 
Euro XIII will include a player draft that will be held on December 1, 2020. The first draft location will be Brisbane, Australia on a date to be announced, the second draft location will be Atlanta, United States. Each team will receive 2-5 draft picks depending on squad strength, with there being 56 picks overall. The draft will work in a similar way to the NFL Draft with weaker clubs getting preference and more draft picks.

2022 Cup Competition

Draw 
The draw took place on October 16, 2020.

Group A1

Group A2

Group B1

Group B2

Knockout stage

References

External links

 
European rugby league competitions
National cup competitions
Rugby league in Europe
Sports leagues established in 2020
2020 establishments in Europe
Multi-national professional sports leagues